The 2007 edition of the IPC Alpine Skiing World Cup were held from January to March, 2007. It was the eighth season of official World Cup competition in alpine skiing where athletes with a disability compete.

Calendar

Standings

Women (overall)

Visually impaired

(x) clinched World Cup title

Sitting

Standing

Men's (overall)

Visually impaired

Sitting

Standing

Nations Cup

References

World Cup, results , IPC Alpine Skiing

Disabled World Cup
Parasports competitions